Geoffrey Alan Lawrence  is an Australian sociologist, academic and researcher. He is Emeritus Professor of Sociology at the University of Queensland.

Lawrence's primary scholarly contributions are in the areas of agri-food studies, social aspects of the environment, natural resource management, genetic engineering, and sport and leisure. He is known for his significant contribution to rural sociology and agri-food studies.

Education
Lawrence attended James Ruse Agricultural High School in Sydney from 1963 until 1968. In 1972, he graduated from the University of Sydney in Agricultural Science, majoring in Agricultural Economics. He then enrolled at the University of New England and obtained a Diploma of Social Science before moving to the United States. He attended the University of Wisconsin-Madison, receiving his master's degree in Sociology in 1978. He moved back to Australia in 1979 and earned his Doctoral degree in 1998 from Griffith University.

Career
Lawrence joined the Riverina College of Advanced Education (later named Charles Sturt University) in 1973 and served as Regional Research Officer until 1977, becoming Lecturer in Sociology from 1978 until 1987. In the following year, he was promoted to Senior Lecturer, and then to Associate Professor. His book, Capitalism and the Countryside: The Rural Crisis in Australia was published in 1987 and received critical acclaim.

In 1993, Lawrence joined Central Queensland University as Foundation Professor of Sociology and later became Head of the Department of Social Sciences and Director of the Rural Social and Economic Research Centre. He established the Institute for Sustainable Regional Development in 1997, becoming its inaugural Executive Director. He was instrumental in the formation of the Fitzroy Basin Association (the catchment management authority for the Central Queensland region), and served as a member of the Management Committee from 1998 until 2002.

Lawrence moved to The University of Queensland in 2002 as Professor of Sociology and Head of the School of Social Science. He remained in the latter role for two terms, from 2002 to 2009. In the following year he became co-leader of the Global Change Institute's Food Security Focal Area, and later became Chair of the Institute's College of Experts. He retired in 2013, becoming Emeritus Professor of Sociology at The University of Queensland.

Lawrence is a former co-editor of the International Journal of Sociology of Agriculture and Food. He was the Inaugural Director of the Centre for Rural Social Research at Charles Sturt University from 1988 to 1993, and launched the journal Rural Society. In 1993 he co-founded the Australasian Agri-food Research Network, an active network of over 100 academics, students and government representatives that holds yearly conferences on rural and agri-food issues. He was a founding member of the international food-based Think Tank in 2013. He was elected President of the International Rural Sociology Association in 2012 and served in that role until 2016.

Research
Lawrence has published over 400 journal articles and book chapters and some 25 books and special editions of journals. He has worked on a range of topics including the sociology of agriculture, rural restructuring, rural ideology, agribusiness, farm politics, the environment, the role of the state, rural welfare, community resilience, social impacts of agricultural biotechnologies, and globalization.

Agriculture and the environment 
With colleagues, Lawrence conducted a path analysis of factors involved in the selection of organic food by Australian consumers. The study showed that concerns about the naturalness of foods was a critical factor in the decision to purchase organic foods. Barriers to the purchase of organic foods were also identified. He showed how the productivist trajectory of Australian agriculture was compromising ecological health and undermining food security, arguing that reversing environmental degradation would be a difficult task in the context of structural and attitudinal factors. He demonstrated the importance of food regime theory in understanding changing relations in agri-food supply chains. He also studied the impacts of ‘supermarketisation’ in altering patterns of food production and consumption.

The restructuring of regional Australia 
Lawrence has studied the globalizing tendencies that lead to significant alterations in agricultural production, and involvement of food companies in marketing. He has written about the social transformation of rural regions, finding that a ‘dynamics of decline’ is present in many rural settings. He examined regulatory governance in Norway, Australia and the United Kingdom and highlighted changes in food governance trajectories. He also identified the impacts of neoliberal policy in increasing vulnerability of both rural communities and the food governance system.

Financialisation of food and farming 
With colleagues, Lawrence has identified the important role finance plays in Australia's food and farming industries. Research has shown that financial entities such as merchant banks, sovereign wealth funds, private equity firms and hedge funds are purchasing farmlands and agribusiness firms in an effort to increase returns to shareholders. Many employ a ‘food security’ discourse to legitimate their activities. However, some of their activities have led to unintended but serious consequences, including food price distortions, land grabbing, social protest and the concentration of power in supply chains.

Awards and honors
1968 – School Captain, James Ruse Agricultural High School
1969–1972 – Commonwealth University Scholarship, Sydney University
1972 – President, Sydney University Agricultural Society
1978–1979 – Australian Wool Corporation Postgraduate Research Scholarship and Travel Grant
1992 – Travel Grant, Australia-New Zealand Foundation
1997 – Distinguished Service Award, US Community Development Society
2002 – Life Member, Fitzroy Basin Association
2002 – Emeritus Professor, Central Queensland University
2004 – Fellow, Academy of Social Sciences in Australia  
2009 – Most cited author, Agriculture and Human Values journal
2011 – ‘Living Book’ award, Brisbane IDEAS Festival
2013 – Most cited author, Agriculture and Human Values journal; second most cited paper, Journal of Rural Studies
2014 – Life Member, The Australian Sociological Association
2016 – Presidential Service Award, International Rural Sociology Association

Bibliography

Books

Selected articles
Lockie, S., Lyons, K., Lawrence, G., & Mummery, K. (2002). Eating ‘green’: motivations behind organic food consumption in Australia. Sociologia ruralis, 42(1), 23–40.
Miller, T., Lawrence, G. A., McKay, J., & Rowe, D. (2000). Globalization and sport: Playing the world. Sage.
Gray, I., Gray, I. W., & Lawrence, G. (2001). A future for regional Australia: Escaping global misfortune. Cambridge University Press.
Lockie, S., Lyons, K., Lawrence, G., & Grice, J. (2004). Choosing organics: a path analysis of factors underlying the selection of organic food among Australian consumers. Appetite, 43(2), 135–146.
Burch, D., & Lawrence, G. (2009). Towards a third food regime: behind the transformation. Agriculture and human values, 26(4), 267–279.
Vanclay, F., & Lawrence, G. (1995). The environmental imperative: eco-social concerns for Australian agriculture.

References

External links 
Geoffrey Lawrence's page on University of Queensland

1950 births
Living people
Australian sociologists
Academic staff of the University of Queensland
University of New England (Australia) alumni
University of Wisconsin–Madison College of Letters and Science alumni
Griffith University alumni
Fellows of the Academy of the Social Sciences in Australia